Archaeolamna is an extinct genus of mackerel sharks that lived during the Cretaceous. It contains three valid species (one with two subspecies) which have been found in Europe, North America, and Australia. While it is mostly known from isolated teeth, an associated set of teeth, jaws, cranial fragments, and vertebrae of A. kopingensis is known from the Pierre Shale of Kansas. Teeth of A. k. judithensis were found with a plesiosaur skeleton with bite marks from the Judith River Formation of Montana.

Archaeolamnidae

When the family Archaeolamnidae was first named, it contained Archaeolamna, Cretodus, Dallasiella, and Telodontaspis. However, Cretodus was reassigned to Pseudoscapanorhynchidae, Dallasiella was reassigned to Lamniformes incertae sedis, and Telodontaspis was synonymized with Cretoxyrhina. This leaves Archaeolamna as the sole member of the family.

References

Lamniformes
Prehistoric shark genera